Cerosterna rouyeri is a species of beetle in the family Cerambycidae. It was described by Ritsema in 1906. It is known from Sumatra and Java.

References

Lamiini
Beetles described in 1906